The Srinivasa Ramanujan Medal, named after the Indian mathematician Srinivasa Ramanujan, is awarded by the Indian National Science Academy for work in the mathematical sciences.

Past recipients include: 
1962 S. Chandrasekhar
1964 B. P. Pal
1966 K. S. Chandrasekharan
1968 P. C. Mahalanobis
1972 G. N. Ramachandran
1974 Harish-Chandra
1979 R. P. Bambah
1982 S. Chowla
1985 C. S. Seshadri
1988 M. S. Narasimhan
1991 M. S. Raghunathan
1997 K. Ramachandra
2003 C. R. Rao
2006 R. Parimala
2008 S. Ramanan
2013 K. R. Parthasarathy
2016 Tyakal Nanjundiah Venkataramana
2019 K. B. Sinha

See also

 List of mathematics awards

References

Srinivasa Ramanujan Medal recipients

Mathematics awards
Awards established in 1962